Asota albivena is a moth of the family Erebidae first described by Francis Walker in 1864. It is found in Sulawesi, Maluku and the Kai Islands.

The wingspan is about 57 mm.

References

Asota (moth)
Moths of Indonesia
Moths described in 1864